Bianca Stone is a Brooklyn based poet and visual artist. Her poems have appeared in literary magazines and poetry collections, and her illustrations are a part of Anne Carson's project, Antigonick.

Early life and education
Stone graduated from Antioch College with a BFA in Language, Literature & Culture, and completed an MFA in poetry at New York University in 2009. Stone's grandmother, the poet Ruth Stone, was the recipient of two Guggenheim Fellowships, the National Book Award for Poetry in 2002, and remains a major influence in Stone's life.

Career
Stone's poems have been published in Best American Poetry 2011, Conduit, and Tin House, among others, and she is the author of the chapbooks I Want To Open The Mouth God Gave You, Beautiful Mutant (Factory Hollow Press, 2012), and I Saw The Devil With His Needlework (Argos Books, 2012). Her illustrations have appeared in a collaboration with former teacher, Anne Carson, entitled Antigonick. This is both a printed book and a multimedia performance piece.

Tin House Books published Stone's book, Someone Else's Wedding Vows, in March 2014. Tin House also published her collection The Möbius Strip of Grief in 2018 and What Is Otherwise Infinite in 2022.

She also edits a small press, Monk Books, with husband Ben Pease in Brooklyn, New York. Stone and Pease were married in August 2014.

References

External links 
 
 Stone bio at the Poetry Foundation website
 Interview at California Poetics

Living people
Antioch College alumni
New York University alumni
Poets from New York (state)
American women poets
People from Brooklyn
1950 births
21st-century American women